Eumetriochroa kalopanacis is a moth of the family Gracillariidae. It is known from Japan (Hokkaidō and Honshū islands).

The wingspan is 6.4-7.2 mm for the autumnal form and about 5.7 mm for the aestival (summer) form. There are two seasonal forms, which differ in size and colour: one is an aestival form with adults on wing in summer from July to August, and the other is an autumnal form with adults on wing in autumn from mid September to October.

The larvae feed on Kalopanax pictus. They mine the leaves of their host plant. The mine is found on the upper side of the leaf and is narrowly linear, but gradually widening towards the terminal end according to the growth of the larva. It is irregularly curved, sometimes even serpentine. A dark brownish line of frass is always seen in the centre of the mine. A pupal chamber is found at the end of the mine, ellipsoidal in form, with a swollen lower side and a wrinkled upper side.

References

Phyllocnistinae
Moths of Japan
Moths described in 1998